William Henry Cavendish-Scott-Bentinck, 4th Duke of Portland,  (24 June 1768 – 27 March 1854), styled Marquess of Titchfield until 1809, was a British politician who served in various positions in the governments of George Canning and Lord Goderich.

Background and education
Portland was the eldest son of Prime Minister William Cavendish-Bentinck, 3rd Duke of Portland and Lady Dorothy, daughter of William Cavendish, 4th Duke of Devonshire and Charlotte Boyle, Baroness Clifford. He was the elder brother of Lord William Bentinck and Lord Charles Bentinck.

He was educated first in Ealing under the tutelage of Samuel Goodenough graduating in 1774, followed by Westminster School (1783). He attended Christ Church, Oxford for two years but did not take a degree. The third Duke, who spared no expense for his heir, sent him to The Hague in 1786 for experience working with the crown's envoy, Sir James Harris. He returned in 1789.

He later received an honorary degree of Doctor of Civil Law from Oxford in 1793. He also served as a Family Trustee of the British Museum; in 1810, he loaned the famed Portland Vase to the museum.

Political career

Portland was Member of Parliament for Petersfield between 1790 and 1791 and for Buckinghamshire between 1791 and 1809.

He served under his father as a Lord of the Treasury between March and September 1807. He remained out of office until April 1827 when he was appointed Lord Privy Seal by his brother-in-law George Canning. He was sworn of the Privy Council the same year. When Lord Goderich became Prime Minister in August 1827, Portland became Lord President of the Council, an office he retained until the government fell in January 1828. Over time the Duke became less of a staunch Conservative, softening to some of the more liberal stances of Canning.

Portland also held the honorary post of Lord Lieutenant of Middlesex between 1794 and 1841.

Family
Portland married Henrietta, eldest daughter and heiress of Major-General John Scott of Fife and his wife Margaret (née Dundas), in London on 4 August 1795. At the time of his marriage he obtained Royal Licence to take the name and arms of Scott in addition to that of Cavendish-Bentinck. They were parents of nine children:

William Henry, Marquess of Titchfield (22 October 1796 – 5 March 1824)
Lady Margaret Harriet (21 April 1798 – 9 April 1882)
Lady Caroline (6 July 1799 – 23 January 1828)
William John Cavendish-Scott-Bentinck, 5th Duke of Portland (12 September 1800 – 6 December 1879)
Lord George Frederick (27 February 1802 – 21 September 1848)
Lord Henry William Bentinck (9 June 1804 – 31 December 1870)
Lady Charlotte (14 Jan 1806 – 30 September 1889); married John Evelyn Denison, 1st Viscount Ossington
Lady Lucy Joan (27 August 1807 – 29 July 1899); married Charles Ellis, 6th Baron Howard de Walden
Lady Mary (8 July 1809 – 20 July 1874); married Sir William Topham

Death and legacy
The Duchess of Portland died on 24 April 1844. Nearly 10 years later, Portland died at the family seat of Welbeck Abbey, Nottinghamshire, in March 1854, aged 85. Two of their sons predeceased their parents; their eldest dying of a brain lesion and their third son dying of a heart attack.

The duke expressed a desire to be buried in the open churchyard in Bolsover, Derbyshire, near the other family seat at Bolsover Castle. However, he was instead interred in the ancient Cavendish vault, that had previously been unopened for 138 years.

He was succeeded in the dukedom by his second son (but the eldest surviving), William.

The department of Manuscripts and Special Collections, The University of Nottingham holds a number of papers relating to Portland: His personal and political papers are part of the Portland (Welbeck) Collection while the Portland (London) Collection contains papers relating to his estate business. The Portland Estate Papers held at Nottinghamshire Archives also contain items relating to Portland's properties.

Arms

Titles 
His full titles were Duke of Portland, Marquess of Titchfield, Earl of Portland, Viscount Woodstock, and Baron Cirencester.

The Most Honourable William Cavendish-Bentinck, Marquess of Titchfield (1768–1795)
The Most Honourable William Cavendish-Scott-Bentinck, Marquess of Titchfield (1795–1809)
His Grace The Duke of Portland (1809–1854)

Ancestors

See also
English Education Act 1835

References

External links 
 
 Biography of the 4th Duke, with links to online catalogues, from Manuscripts and Special Collections, The University of Nottingham

|-

1768 births
1854 deaths
People educated at Westminster School, London
Alumni of Christ Church, Oxford
British racehorse owners and breeders
British landowners
People from Welbeck
Children of prime ministers of the United Kingdom
104
William, 4th Duke of Portland
William, 4th Duke of Portland
Lord-Lieutenants of Middlesex
Lords Privy Seal
Members of the Privy Council of the United Kingdom
Titchfield, William Scott-Bentinck, Marquess of
British MPs 1790–1796
British MPs 1796–1800
Titchfield, William Scott-Bentinck, Marquess of
Titchfield, William Scott-Bentinck, Marquess of
Titchfield, William Scott-Bentinck, Marquess of
Titchfield, William Scott-Bentinck, Marquess of
Titchfield, William Scott-Bentinck, Marquess of
Portland, D4
Owners of Epsom Derby winners